The Alogi (ἄλογοι), also called Alogoi or Alogians, were a group of heterodox Christians in Asia Minor that flourished c. 200 CE, and taught that the Gospel of John and the Apocalypse of John (Book of Revelation) were not the work of the Apostle, but his adversary Cerinthus. What we know of them is derived from their doctrinal opponents, whose literature is extant, particularly St. Epiphanius of Salamis. It was Epiphanius who coined the name "Alogi" as a word play suggesting that they were both illogical (anti-logikos) and they were against the Christian doctrine of the Logos.  While Epiphanius does not specifically indicate the name of its founder, Dionysius Bar-Salibi, citing a lost work of Hippolytus (Capita Adversus Caium), writes in his commentary on the Apocalypse,Hippolytus the Roman says: A man appeared, named Caius, saying that the Gospel is not by John, nor the Apocalypse but that it is by Cerinthus the heretic.Cf. Eusebius, Ecclesiastical History, 3.28.2According to fourth century church historian Eusebius of Caesarea, Caius was a churchman of Rome who wrote during the time of Pope Zephyrinus, and had published a disputation with Proclus, a Montanist leader in Rome.

Beliefs 
“St. Epiphanius (Haer. LI) gives a long account of the party of heretics who arose after the Cataphrygians, Quartodecimans, and others, and who received neither the Gospel of St. John nor his Apocalypse.”; they instead attributed the two New Testament books to the Gnostic Cerinthus, who was actually an enemy of John the Apostle.

Regarding their beliefs, Epiphanius asserts that the Alogians denied the continuation of spiritual gifts in the church in opposition to the Montanists. They explicitly deny the Logos doctrine in John chapter 1 and they deny Johannine authorship by comparing his Gospel with the synoptic Gospels. Their methodology can be seen in the surviving fragments of Hippolytus of Rome's refutation, Capita Adversus Caium, preserved in Bar-Salibi's Commentary on the Apocalypse. Their comparative method was considered very foolish in Epiphanius’ opinion who derided them as "without reason".

Epiphanius argues that Cerinthus could not have written the Gospel of John because whereas Cerinthus denied the deity of Christ, the Gospel taught Christ's Godhead. Epiphanius contemplates that they may not reject Christ's deity outright, but instead just the “Logos form under which the doctrine was presented in the Gospel”. Epiphanius also asserts in regard to the Alogi, “they themselves seem to believe as we do.” He therefore is not so much concerned with their Christology as much as he is concerned with their biblical criticism. Nevertheless, Epiphanius is harsh in his condemnation of them and asserts that the bottom line for the Alogi is that they deny the Gospel of John and consequently the Word-Flesh Logos doctrine. Epiphanius clearly distinguishes them from the Ebionites and from the Docetists.

References

Resources

 Gwynn, J. "Hippolytus and his “Heads against Caius”," Hermathena, 6 (1888), 397-418.
 Bludau, A. Die Ersten Gegner der Johannes-Schriften (Biblische Studien, 22, Hefte 1 and 2; 1925).
 Fisher, G. P. "Some Remarks on the Alogi," Papers of the American Society of Church History, 2,1 (1890), pp. 1–9.
 Hall, S. G. "Aloger," in Theologische Realenzyklopadia 2. Edited by G. Krause, G. Muller, et al. Berlin: 1977 ff., 290–95.
 The Panarion of Epiphanius of Salamis: Book II and III, Translated by Frank Williams. Leiden: Brill, 1997. .
 Rose, V. “Question Johannine. Les Aloges asiatiques et les aloges romains,” Revue Biblique 6 (1897): 516–34.
 Smith, J. D. Gaius and the Controversy over the Johannine Literature (PhD diss.), Yale University, 1979.
 Trevett, Chr. Montanism: Gender, Authority and the New Prophesy (Cambridge, 1996), pp. 29, 66, 138–41, 262–3.

External links
 The article on the “Alogi” in Volume 1 of The Catholic Encyclopedia
 The article on the "Alogi" in The New Schaff-Herzog Encyclopedia of Religious Knowledge, 1:135.
Catholic Encyclopedia: Montanists: Montanism in the West: "The old notion that the Alogi were an Asiatic sect (see ALOGI) is no longer tenable; they were the Roman Gaius and his followers, if he had any."

2nd-century Christianity
170s
Gnosticism
Christian anti-Gnosticism
Heresy in ancient Christianity
Schisms in Christianity
Christian terminology